The Michigan Veterans Affairs Agency (MVAA) is a state government agency which is a part of the Department of Military and Veterans Affairs that functions as the central coordinating point for Michigan veterans, connecting those who have served in the U.S. Armed Forces, and their families, to services and benefits throughout the state.

The agency director is of a cabinet-level, the chief advisor to Governor and all department head regarding veterans services' policies, programs and procedures.

Background
In 1885, the state opened the Michigan Soldiers Home, later the Veterans Facility of Michigan, to provide care for Civil War veterans. A Board of Managers was created to set the rules and regulations and appoint the home commandant.:7 A new hospital replaced it 1906. The home was transferred into the Department of Public Health in 1970.:7

The State began making veterans service organization (VSO) grant appropriation in 1927 with one to the American Legion. Soon, grants were extended to the Veterans of Foreign Wars and the Disabled American Veterans. Two more VSOs, American Veterans of World War II and Korea (AMVETS) and the Marine Corps League were added by 1960 with 11 VSOs receiving grants and the Veterans of World War I receives a token amount.:13

Post-World War II, the state set up a trust fund, Michigan Veterans Trust Fund, for financial assistance to wartime veterans.

For the Upper Peninsula on May 27, 1981, a veteran's home, the D.J. Jacobetti Veterans Home,  in Marquette was opened. In 1991 and 1992 by Executive Orders, the two veteran's homes were transferred to the Department of Military Affairs.:7

All but some rural Michigan Counties operated veterans offices with veterans counselors, but many such offices face funding shortfalls and under-staffing. The state and local government provided vocational training to states.

Veterans Affairs Directorate
The Veterans Affairs Directorate was formed in 1997 to consolidate the department's major veteran's programs.:1 The Veterans Affairs Directorate managed the Michigan Veterans' Trust Fund, Vietnam Veterans' Memorial Monument Fund and two homes for veterans. The Veteran's Fund is under the direction of the Board of Trustees, which has seven members, while the Monument Fund is under a nine-member governing Commission. State Veterans Home Board of Managers had oversight of the two veteran homes. The directorate also directs grants to 12 veterans' service organizations as specified by law.

Agency history

Michigan was last in veteran benefit amounts in 2010. In 2013, 22 percent of Michigan's veterans were receiving health benefits from the Veterans Health Administration and moved to 5 from the bottom in spending. With a large number  of veterans in the state, Governor Snyder decided veterans missing out on benefits was unacceptable.

The agency was created when Governor Rick Snyder issued an executive order on January 18, 2013, within the Department of Military and Veterans Affairs effective March 20, 2013. The agency took over from the department various responsibilities formerly held directly by the department in its Veterans Affairs Directorate, support for the State Veterans Home Board of Managers and Veterans Speakers Program. Jeff Barnes was appointed the agency's first director. In April 2013, the agency moved from the department's headquarter north of downtown Lansing to downtown Washington Square.

In July 2014, the agency started a hotline operation, Michigan Veteran Resource Service Center, similar to and in conjunction with United Ways' 2-1-1 telephone information system. The service is a first for a state to be fully integrated with the 2-1-1 system.

Michigan Veteran Health System was formed in October 2015 under CEO Leslie Shanlian to integrate the two "Home for Veterans" facilities that the agency operates into one organization. The system's management team was named by Shanlian in early February 2016. Bradford "Brad" Slagle was appointed interim CEO of MVHS in November 2016 after Shanlian departed for the private sector.

On February 18, 2016, a state audit was released; the Grand Rapids Home for Veterans was flagged with nine oversight flaws, some of which led to substandard care. Some legislators deemed this to be neglect. The next day the agency director resigned with an interim director, James Redford, a former Kent County Circuit Court judge and veteran, being named as his replacement. Redford was named the full director on April 27, 2017.

In June 2019, a new director was named, Zaneta Adams, becoming the first woman veteran to serve on the Cabinet.  https://www.michigan.gov/dmva/0,9665,7-402-100108_95837_97632-251980--,00.html

In 2019, the Michigan Veterans Homes was established by the Facility Authority and Anne Zerbe became its Executive Director.

Units

Michigan Veteran Health System - State Veterans Home Board of Managers (staggered six-year terms, seven veteran members with 6 from 4 veteran organizations)::7-8
D. J. Jacobetti Home for Veterans
Grand Rapids Home for Veterans
Michigan Veterans Trust Fund - seven-member Board of Trustees
 Michigan Veteran Resource Service Center

References 

 
16. ^ “Attorney Named to Lead Michigan Veterans Affairs Agency”http://legalnews.com/detroit/1476173

External links 

Veterans Affairs Agency
Government agencies established in 2013
American veterans' organizations